The  Santuari del Corredor (Shrine of the Corredor) is a 16th-century hermitage  within the  municipality of Dosrius, Spain.  The building is dedicated to the Blessed Virgin, but takes its name from the Corredor hills in the Natural Park of El Montnegre i el Corredor. 

It is the annual destination of inhabitants of Canyamars who every May Day go there to celebrate the ending of an Influenza epidemic in the village in the 17th century.

References

 GARRIGA, JOAQUIM. (2002-2003).  . Locus Amoenus, UAB, núm. 6 (2002-2003), p. 187-227. 

Catholic pilrimage sites
Corredor